is a Japanese voice actor and narrator.  He voices Sasuke Uchiha in Naruto, Uryū Ishida in Bleach and Shirō Emiya in Fate/stay night.

Filmography

Anime
2002
 Naruto (Sasuke Uchiha)
 Beyblade: V-Force (Blader DJ)
 Mirage of Blaze (Additional voice)

2003
 Beyblade G Revolution (Blader DJ)
 Full Metal Panic? Fumoffu (Crewman)
 Dark Shell (Fukushima)

2004
 Bleach (Uryū Ishida)

2005
 The Law of Ueki (Ancho Kabara)
 Kamichu! (Inu-Oshu/dog priest)
 Hell Girl (Mamoru Hanagasa)
 Fushigiboshi no Futagohime Gyu! (Hills)
 Damekko Dōbutsu (Usahara)

2006
 The Story of Saiunkoku (Shōrin, Sânta)
 Code Geass: Lelouch of the Rebellion (Rivalz Cardemonde, Kento Sugiyama)
 Fate/stay night (Shirō Emiya)
 Gintama (Sniper Kame)

2007
 Toward the Terra (Tony)
 Ōkiku Furikabutte (Junta Takase)
 Naruto: Shippuden (Sasuke Uchiha)
 Koutetsu Sangokushi (Chouun Shiryuu)
 Moyashimon (Takuma Kawahama)

2008
 Black Butler (William T. Spears)
 Code Geass: Lelouch of the Rebellion R2 (Rivalz Cardemonde, Kento Sugiyama)

2009
 Hetalia: Axis Powers (England)
 Metal Fight Beyblade (Blader DJ)

2010
 Hetalia: World Series (England)
 Metal Fight Beyblade Baku (Blader DJ)
 Shukufuku no Campanella (Aberdeen Roland)
 Stitch! ~Zutto Saikō no Tomodachi~ (Wishy-Washy, Slushy, Student A)
 Black Butler II (William T. Spears)

2011
 Metal Fight Beyblade 4D (Blader DJ)
 Cardfight!! Vanguard (Katsumi Morikawa)
 Carnival Phantasm (Shirō Emiya)
 Nyanpire (Masamunya Dokuganryu)

2012
 Moyasimon Returns (Takuma Kawahama)
 Kimi to Boku. 2 (Akihiro)
 Hagure Yuusha no Estetica (Phil Barnett)

2013
 Hetalia: The Beautiful World (England) 
 Fate/kaleid liner Prisma Illya (Shirō Emiya)
 Hakkenden: Eight Dogs of the East (Seiran)
 Meganebu! (William Satou)

2014
 Fate/kaleid liner Prisma Illya 2wei! (Shirō Emiya)
 Fate/stay night Unlimited Blade Works (Shirō Emiya)
 Kamigami no Asobi (Thor Megingjard)
 Francesca: Girls be ambitious (Ishikawa Takuboku)
 Hozuki's Coolheadedness (Goban)
 Sengoku Basara Judge End (Ōtomo Sōrin)
 Black Butler Book of Circus (William T. Spears)

2015
 Hetalia: The World Twinkle (England)
 Blood Blockade Battlefront  (DJ Fango)
 Fate/stay night: Unlimited Blade Works 2nd Season (Shirō Emiya)
 Fate/kaleid liner Prisma Illya 2wei! Herz! (Shirō Emiya)

2016
 Norn9 (Shukuri Akito)
 Fate/kaleid liner Prisma Illya 3rei! (Shirō Emiya)
 D.Gray-man Hallow (Arystar Krory III)
 ReLIFE (Akira Inukai)
 Maho Girls PreCure! (Orba)

2017Boruto: Naruto Next Generations (Sasuke Uchiha)Spiritpact (Intetsu)One Piece (Vinsmoke Ichiji)Clean Freak! Aoyama-kun (Gaku Ishikawa)Hell Girl: The Fourth Twilight (Mamoru Hanagasa)

2018Kakuriyo: Bed and Breakfast for Spirits (Hakkabou)Butlers: Chitose Momotose Monogatari (Takashi Mikuni)Spiritpact (Intetsu)Hinomaru Sumo (Jin Yomoda)

2019Mob Psycho 100 (Ryo Shimazaki)Wise Man's Grandchild (Lawrence)Actors: Songs Connection (Keishi Harumoto)

2020Bofuri (Kuromu)

2021Hetalia: World Stars (England)

2022The Case Study of Vanitas (Loki Oriflamme)Bleach: Thousand-Year Blood War (Uryū Ishida)

2023Bofuri 2nd Season (Kuromu)

Original video animationSentō Yōsei Yukikaze (2002) (Ito)Carnival Phantasm (2011) (Shirō Emiya)Naruto Shippūden: Sunny Side Battle!!! (2014) (Sasuke Uchiha)

Anime films
 Naruto the Movie: Ninja Clash in the Land of Snow (2004) (Sasuke Uchiha)
 Bleach: Memories of Nobody (2006) (Uryū Ishida)
 Bleach: The DiamondDust Rebellion (2007) (Uryū Ishida)
 Naruto Shippuden the Movie: Bonds (2008) (Sasuke Uchiha)
 Axis Powers - Paint it, White! (2010) (England)
 Beyblade: Sol Blaze, the Scorching Hot Invader (2010) (Blader DJ)
 Bleach: Hell Verse (2010) (Uyrū Ishida)
 Heart no Kuni no Alice (2011) (Boris Airay)
 009 Re:Cyborg (2012) (008)
 Road to Ninja: Naruto the Movie (2012) (Sasuke Uchiha)
 The Last: Naruto the Movie (2014) (Sasuke Uchiha)
 Boruto: Naruto the Movie (2015) (Sasuke Uchiha)
 Black Butler: Book of the Atlantic (2017) (William T. Spears)
 Fate/kaleid liner Prisma Illya: Oath Under Snow (2017) (Shirō Emiya)
 Fate/stay night: Heaven's Feel (2017-2020) (Shirō Emiya)

Video games
2003
 Naruto games (Sasuke Uchiha)
2005
 Bleach games (Uryū Ishida)
2004
 Riviera: The Promised Land (Hector)
2005
 Duel Savior (Taiga)
2006
 Imouto flag (Suzumori Taichi)
2007
 Imouto route (Suzumori Taichi)
 Shōnen Onmyōji (Abe no Masachika)
 Hakarena Heart ~Ta ga Tame ni Kimi wa Aru~ (Hanyuu Ryouya)
 Alice in the Country of Hearts (Boris Airay)
 Fate/stay night Realta Nua (Shirō Emiya)
 Fate/tiger colosseum (Shirō Emiya)
 Magician's Academy (Professor Sagami)
2008
 Infinite Undiscovery (Kiriya)
 Twinkle Crusaders (Virus)
 Fate/tiger colosseum Upper (Shirō Emiya)
 Fate/Unlimited Codes (Shirō Emiya)
2009
 Atelier Annie: Alchemists of Sera Island (Hans Arlens)
 Arcobaleno (Basilio Graziani)
 Imouto wife (Suzumori Taichi)
 Ellvarier (Raven)
 Starry☆Sky 〜in Autumn〜 (Takuya Nashimoto)
 Date ni Game Tsui Wake Jane! (Saul)
 Danzai no Maria (Mikagami Shuurei, Zakariel)
 Final Fantasy Crystal Chronicles: The Crystal Bearers (Keiss)
 Fate/unlimited Codes Portable (Shirō Emiya)
 MagnaCarta II (Crocell)
 Million KNights Vermilion (Sven)
 Moyasimon DS (Takuma Kawahama)
2010
 Ar tonelico III (Aoto)
 Clock Zero (Toranosuke Saionji/Traitor)
 Shukufuku no Campanella Portable (Aberdeen Roland)
 Starry☆Sky 〜in Autumn〜 Portable (Takuya Nashimoto)
 Sengoku Basara 3 (Ōtomo Sōrin)
 Tartaros (Lucius)
 Beyblade: Metal Fusion (Blader DJ)
 Last Escort -Club Katze- (Johan)
2011
 Okashi na Shima no Peter Pan ~Sweet Never Land~ (Tink Bell)
 Gakuen Hetalia Portable (England)
 Clock Zero Portable (Toranosuke Saionji/Traitor)
 Starry☆Sky 〜After Autumn〜 Portable (Takuya Nashimoto)
 Sengoku Basara 3: Utage (Ōtomo Sōrin)
 Tsugi no Giseisha o Oshirase Shimasu (Kashizawa)
 Nazowaku Yakata Oto no aida ni aida ni (Parokku Homes)
 Beyond the Future - Fix the Time Arrows (Holo)
 Omerta ~Chinmoku ni Okite~ (Ugajin Ken)
2012
 Atelier Ayesha (Ernie Lyttelton)
 Gakuen Hetalia DS (England)
 Shinobazu Seven (Genki Tounosawa)
 Hana Awase Mizuchi Hen (Utsutsu, Ime)
 Hitofuta Kitan (Futatsuo)
 Yamikara no Izanai Tenebrae I (Tenji)
2013
 Cardfight!! Vanguard: Ride to Victory!! (Katsumi Morikawa)
 Kamigami no Asobi (Thor Megingjard)
 The Guided Fate Paradox (Rakiel Ljuin)
 Conception II: Children of the Seven Stars (Alexi)
 JoJo's Bizarre Adventure: All Star Battle (Bruno Bucciarati)
 Rage of Bahamut (Noah, Avenging Soul)
 Shiratsuyu no Kai (Kanda Chiaki)
 Danzai no Maria Complete Edition (Mikagami Shuurei, Zakariel)
 Snow Bound Land (Demon)
 NORN9 (Shukuri Akito)
 Princess Arthur (Medraut)
2014
 Ayakashi Gohan (Hana Suou)
 Muramasa Rebirth (Seikichi)
 Kuroyuki hime -Snow Black- (Dune Baxter)
 Kuroyuki hime -Snow Magic- (Dune Baxter)
 J-Stars Victory VS (Sasuke Uchiha)
 Sengoku Basara 4 (Ōtomo Sōrin)
 Norn9 Var Commons (Shukuri Akito)
 Bakumatsu Rock (Yataro Iwasaki)
 Fate/Hollow Ataraxia (Shirō Emiya)
 Fate/kaleid liner Prisma Illya (Shirō Emiya)
 Holy Breaker! (Hida Kaishou)
 Mermaid Gosick (Basil Adilworth)
2015
 Elsword (Ciel)
 Kamigami no Asobi InFinite (Thor Megingjard)
 Fate/Grand Order (Muramasa)
 Clock Zero ExTime (Toranosuke Saionji/Traitor)
 JoJo's Bizarre Adventure: Eyes of Heaven (Bruno Bucciarati)
 Sengoku Basara 4: Sumeragi (Ōtomo Sōrin)
 Norn9 Last Era (Shukuri Akito)
 Luminous Arc Infinity (Elvio)
 Yunohana Spring (Katsuragi Naomasa)
2016
 Hana Awase Karakurenai/Utsutsu Hen (Utsutsu, Ime)
 Yunohana Spring 〜Cherishing Time〜 (Katsuragi Naomasa)
 SA7 -Silent Ability Seven- (Crawforo Takami)
 Kyoukai no Shirayuki (Kaine Kumishima)
 Black Rose Valkyrie (Cielo)
 Sengoku Basara: Sanada Yukimura-Den (Ōtomo Sōrin)
 Norn9 Act Tune (Shukuri Akito)
 100 Sleeping Princes & the Kingdom of Dreams (Volker)
 Watch Dogs 2 (Wrench)
2017
 The Witch and the Hundred Knight 2 (Theodur)
 Onmyōji (Abe no Seimei, Kuro Seimei)
 Code: Realize − Silver Miracles (Aiguille)
 CARAVAN STORIES (Piet)
 Final Heroes (Zoro)
 Dissidia Final Fantasy: Opera Omnia (Zell Dincht)
2018
 LibraryCross∞ (Shukuri Akito, Katsuragi Naomasa)
 The Alchemist Code (Yuto)
 Granblue Fantasy (Krelkulkil)
2019
 Jump Force (Sasuke Uchiha)
 Final Fantasy XV: Episode Ardyn (Young Verstael Besithia)
 One Piece Treasure Cruise (Vinsmoke Ichiji)Mahoutsukai no Yakusoku (Nero)
2020
 Disney: Twisted-Wonderland (Grim)
 Crash Bandicoot 4: It's About Time (Ika Ika)
2021
 Fate/Grand Order (Senji Muramasa)
2022
 Tactics Ogre: Reborn (Vyce Bozeck)
2023
 Ikemen Villains (Harrison Gray)

Drama CD

 Amemakura (Genki)
 Exit Tunes Presents ACTORS (Harumoto Keishi)
 Girl's Therapist Case 1 (Amagishi Kira)
 Haikagura (Tekkai)
 Hetalia: Axis Powers Drama CD (England)
 Hetalia: Axis Powers Hitsuji De Oyasumi Vol. 15 (England)
 Hikaru Ga Chikyuu Ni Ita Koro Koezaru Wa Akai Hana (Naran)
 Love Presenter Love Trip (Sasaki)
 ONE x 3 (Aoitsuki Saki)
 Renai Jōtō Ikemen Gakuen (Tatsumi Ryoji)
 Road to Charasuke (Sasuke Uchiha)
 Ryūnohanawazurai Sengoku Soine (Date)
 Sono Ai Wa Yamai Ni Itaru (Mamiya Kanoe)
 Tsundere Darling Vanquish Brothers (Kenshin)
 Yours For An Hour (Aki Tsukikage)
 Romantic Joutou (Ekihito)

Tokusatsu
 Zyuden Sentai Kyoryuger (Debo Tangosekku)
 Zyuden Sentai Kyoryuger Returns: Hundred Years After (Debo Harudamonne)

Dubbing
Live-action
 Bring It On (Les) (Huntley Ritter)
 The Bronze (Ben Lawfort) (Thomas Middleditch)
 Day Watch (Yegor) (Dmitry Martynov)
 Final Destination 5 (Sam Lawton) (Nicholas D'Agosto)
 Footloose (Ren McCormack) (Kenny Wormald)
 Ghost World (Josh) (Brad Renfro)
 Love Island (Carrington Rodriguez)
 Outlander (Roger Wakefield) (Richard Rankin)
 Slaughterhouse Rulez (Don Wallace) (Finn Cole)

Animation
 Ben 10: Alien Force (Kevin Levin)
 Foster's Home for Imaginary Friends'' (Blooregard "Bloo" Q. Kazoo)

References

External links
  
 Official agency profile 
 Noriaki Sugiyama at GamePlaza Haruka Voice Acting Database 
 

Living people
Japanese male video game actors
Japanese male voice actors
Male voice actors from Tokyo
21st-century Japanese male actors
Year of birth missing (living people)
20th-century Japanese male actors